Jumper was a pop group in Kristinehamn, Sweden, active between 1996 and 2001, scoring single chart successes in Sweden with songs like När hela världen står utanför, Tapetklister, Välkommen hit and Miljonär.

The band won a 1996 Rockbjörnen award in the category "Swedish group of the year".

Bandmembers
Niklas Hillbom - song and guitar
Preben Rydin - guitar and chorus
Martin Andersson - bass and chorus
Jonas Moberg - drums
Jan "Linda" Lindström - guitar, piano, organ and chorus

References 

2001 disestablishments in Sweden
1996 establishments in Sweden
Musical groups disestablished in 2001
Musical groups established in 1996
Swedish pop music groups